Sarah Juel Werner (born 27 July 1992) is a Danish actress. She appeared in more than ten films since 2002.

Selected filmography

References

External links

1992 births
Danish child actresses
Danish film actresses
Living people